Robert Huick or Hewicke (by 1515 – 6 September 1580), of London, Enfield and St. Martin-in-the-Fields, Middlesex, was an English physician. He was also briefly a member of parliament for a few weeks in the years 1547 and 1553.

Family and education
Huick was educated at Merton College, University of Oxford. By 1546, he was married to Elizabeth Slighfield, a sister of Henry and Walter Slighfield of Peckham, Kent; they had one or two daughters. He later married Mary Woodcock, and they had one daughter. One of his daughters was Anna Huick, wife of Sir Mark Steward (1524-1604), MP, of Stuntney in Cambridgeshire.

Career
Huick was an academic of the University of Oxford and served as Principal of St Alban Hall from 1535 to 1536. He was also a physician and was briefly a Member of the Parliament of England for Wootton Bassett in 1547 and for Camelford in March 1553.

References

1580 deaths
Politicians from London
People from Enfield, London
Year of birth uncertain
English MPs 1547–1552
English MPs 1553 (Edward VI)
Alumni of Merton College, Oxford
Principals of St Alban Hall, Oxford